ŽFK Pančevo (Serbian Cyrillic: ЖФК Пaнчeвo) is a women's football club based in Pančevo, Serbia. They currently play in the northern section of the second division in Serbia, the Druga Liga Srbije Sever.

Current squad 

Andjelija Ilić
Milica Broš 
Marija Zelenović
Ivana Đurkin
Nataša Petrić
Biljana Perošević
Bojana Cvijić
Dajana Mitić
Milana Spiridonov
Natalija Sipić
Branka Lazarević
Negica Ilić
Daliborka Dupalo
Sanja Pavlović
Tijana Minoski
Natalija Đurovski
Željana Milošević
Marina Bošnjak
Milena Radović

External links
  Official Website on Facebook

Women's football clubs in Serbia
2006 establishments in Serbia